William Peck (born April 1, 1979) is a guitarist from Orlando, Florida. Peck is best known for being a close friend with musician Mark Tremonti and for being featured in Guitar One Magazine several times.

Bill Peck released his first instructional DVD, 'Six-String Assault' in 2011, which featured world-renowned shred guitarist Michael Angelo Batio, and Grammy award-winning songwriter/guitarist Mark Tremonti.

Live Music 
Bill Peck has played live many times with Michael Angelo Batio.

Tours 
He toured nationally in 2001 with Gotti 13 on the 'N Sync Pop Odessey tour and in 2002 with electronica group Prophecy Collective. Peck is sponsored by Dean Guitars, Morley Pedals, and Dean Markley Strings.

Bill Peck performed on the Michael Angelo Batio Hands Without Shadows clinic tour in Orlando, Tampa, Clearwater, Sarasota and several times at the Dean Owners of America annual party.

Style 
His signature 8 finger legato harmony technique was first published in Guitar One's September 2006 issue.

Peck has performed with Vinnie Moore as well as performing with Trivium. He also appeared as a guest on Mark Tremonti's guitar instructional DVD The Sound and the Story. He is a noted enthusiast of affliction shirts and bmx bikes which he believes enhance the "shred".

Discography
Internal Flames (2000) The Orchard
Hands Without Shadows (2005) M.A.C.E. Music
Guitar One (Sept. 2006) Lesson DVD

References

External links
Dean Guitars Website

1979 births
Living people
Guitarists from Florida
Musicians from Orlando, Florida
American male guitarists
21st-century American guitarists
21st-century American male musicians